Maha Haddioui (born 15 May 1988) is a Moroccan professional golfer who plays on the Ladies European Tour.  She is the first Arab with playing privileges on the Ladies European Tour.

She attended Lynn University, where she was the top-ranked golfer in NCAA Division II.

Haddioui qualified for the 2016 Summer Olympics. At the Olympics, she finished in last place.

Haddioui also qualified for the 2020 Summer Olympics, during which she scored a hole-in-one, but finished tied for 43rd place at one over par.

References

External links
 
 
 
 
 

Moroccan female golfers
Ladies European Tour golfers
Olympic golfers of Morocco
Golfers at the 2016 Summer Olympics
Golfers at the 2020 Summer Olympics
Lynn Fighting Knights women's golfers
Sportspeople from Casablanca
People from Agadir
1988 births
Living people